Peter Swanson (born May 26, 1968) is an American author, best known for his psychological suspense novels The Kind Worth Killing and Her Every Fear.

His ninth and most recent novel, The Kind Worth Saving, a sequel to 'The Kind Worth Killing' was released in March 2023.

Swanson wrote fiction for ten years before finding an agent who read a short story of his online, leading to the eventual publication of his debut novel The Girl With a Clock for a Heart. He has also written short stories and poetry.

Personal life
Swanson lives on the North Shore of Massachusetts. He is married to Charlene Sawyer and has a cat.

Books 
 The Girl with a Clock for a Heart (2014)  
 The Kind Worth Killing (2015)  
 Her Every Fear (2017)  
 All the Beautiful Lies (2018)  
 Before She Knew Him (2019)  
 Eight Perfect Murders (2020) 
 Every Vow You Break: A Novel (2021) 
 Nine Lives: A Novel (2022) 
 The Kind Worth Saving (2023)

Awards
 New England Society Book Award (2016)
 Crime Writers Association, Ian Fleming - Steel Dagger Finalist (2015)

References

External links
 Author website

1968 births
Living people
American mystery writers
21st-century American novelists